SCSI Pass Through Direct (SPTD) is a proprietary device driver and application programming interface (API) developed by Duplex Secure Ltd. that provides a new method of access to SCSI storage devices. The SPTD API is not open to the public.

Uses 
SPTD is used by Daemon Tools and Alcohol 120%. It is also utilized in PowerArchiver Pro 2010 (v11.60+); however, a configurable option is available to disable it. It is known to be incompatible with kernel-mode debugging including WinDbg and Microsoft's other command line debuggers as well as SoftICE. Further, certain versions of the freeware optical media burning software ImgBurn will issue a warning, "SPTD can have a detrimental effect on drive performance", if the application detects that SPTD is active or installed.

ConeXware, Inc. (the maker of PowerArchiver) claims that in their internal testing, SPTD improved optical drive performance by up to 20 percent in comparison to the "old school" SCSI Pass Through Interface.

See also
 SCSI
 Advanced SCSI Programming Interface (ASPI)
 SCSI Pass Through Interface (SPTI)

References

Further reading

 

Application programming interfaces
SCSI
Device drivers